"You Took the Words Right Out of My Mouth" (also known as "You Took the Words Right Out of My Mouth (Hot Summer Night)") is the first solo single by the American singer Meat Loaf, released in 1977. It is a track from his album Bat Out of Hell, written by Jim Steinman.

Background
The power ballad begins with a spoken word introduction by Jim Steinman and actress Marcia McClain:

Steinman: On a hot summer night, would you offer your throat to the wolf with the red roses?
McClain: Will he offer me his mouth?
Steinman: Yes.
McClain: Will he offer me his teeth?
Steinman: Yes.
McClain: Will he offer me his jaws?
Steinman: Yes.
McClain: Will he offer me his hunger?
Steinman: Yes.
McClain: Again, will he offer me his hunger?
Steinman: Yes!
McClain: And will he starve without me?
Steinman: Yes!
McClain: And does he love me?
Steinman: Yes.
McClain: Yes.
Steinman: On a hot summer night, would you offer your throat to the wolf with the red roses?
McClain: Yes.
Steinman: I bet you say that to all the boys.

Steve Popovich reportedly listened to the intro to the song and it became a key factor of his accepting Bat Out of Hell for Cleveland International Records.

According to his autobiography, Meat Loaf asked Jim Steinman to write a song that was not 15 or 20 minutes long, and, in Meat Loaf's words, a "pop song." His autobiography also dates the writing of the song to 1975, the song reportedly being a key factor in Meat Loaf and Steinman deciding to do an album together.

The song was the first single released from the album, with an edit of "For Crying Out Loud" as the B-side. The record peaked at No. 73 in the Record World singles chart, but only reached No. 97 in Cash Box and didn't appear at all in Billboard Hot 100. Billboard reviewed the single, finding the guitar introduction to be energetic, the beat to be "catchy" and the vocal performance to be somewhat similar to Bruce Springsteen.  Billboard also commented on how occasional pauses in the instruments allow the "infectious" vocals to be highlighted.  Following the success of the next two singles, "Two Out of Three Ain't Bad" and "Paradise by the Dashboard Light", the song was re-released in October 1978 with "Paradise by the Dashboard Light" as the B-side.  This issue peaked at No. 39 on the Billboard Hot 100 chart, over a year after the first release of the song.

Reception
Cash Box called it "a classic rocker from its Spector-esque drum sound to the a capella coda with handclaps" and said that it "is a perfect rock synthesis."  It also said that Meat Loaf provides a "shivering performance."  Record World called it a "powerful pop-rocker" and said that "the title/hook is as good as any this year."

Music video
The video, as with "Two Out of Three Ain't Bad", "Paradise by the Dashboard Light", and the others in the "Bat out of Hell" set, was filmed on a soundstage as if it were a live performance, with Meat Loaf in his signature suspenders, ripped formal shirt, and bearing a red scarf.

Personnel
 Meat Loaf - lead vocals, percussion (as Marvin Lee)
 Todd Rundgren - guitar, percussion, backing vocals
 Kasim Sultan - bass guitar
 Roy Bittan - piano, keyboards
 Jim Steinman - keyboards, percussion, male dialogue intro
 Roger Powell - synthesizer
 Edgar Winter - saxophone
 Max Weinberg - drums
 Rory Dodd, Ellen Foley - additional backing vocals
 Marcia McClain - female dialogue intro

Charts and certifications

Weekly charts

Year-end charts

Certifications

References

Songs about language
1977 debut singles
Meat Loaf songs
Songs written by Jim Steinman
Song recordings produced by Todd Rundgren
Song recordings with Wall of Sound arrangements
1977 songs
Epic Records singles
Rock ballads